Those known as the father, mother, or considered a founder in a Humanities field are those who have made important contributions to that field. In some fields several people are considered the founders, while in others the title of being the "father" is debatable.

Arts

Communication

Education

History

Justice

Language and literature

Law

Music

Performance art

Philosophy and religion

Notes

References 

Humanities
Humanities